NUCA may refer to:

National Utility Contractors Association
Nunavut Court of Appeal